('culture struggle') was a fierce conflict that took place from 1872 to 1878 between the Catholic Church led by Pope Pius IX and the government of Prussia led by Otto von Bismarck. The main issues were clerical control of education and ecclesiastical appointments.
By extension the term  is sometimes used to describe any conflict between secular and religious authorities or deeply opposing values, beliefs between sizable factions within a nation, community, or other group.

Background

Europe and the Catholic Church 
Under the influence of new emerging philosophies and ideologies, such as the enlightenment, realism, positivism, materialism, nationalism, secularism, and liberalism, the role of religion in society and the relationship between society and established churches underwent profound changes in the 18th and 19th centuries. Political leaders in many countries endeavored to strip the church of secular powers, whereas in earlier times the church and state were integrally connected; to reduce the duties of the church to spiritual affairs by secularising the public sphere and by separation of church and state; and to assert the supremacy of the state, especially in education. Róisín Healy argues that across Europe, the Kulturkampf operated mainly on the state level. It developed "especially in strongholds of liberalism, anti-clericalism, and anti-Catholicism".

The Catholic Church resisted this development, which it portrayed as an attack on religion, and it sought to maintain and strengthen its strong role in the state and society. With the growing influence of enlightenment and after having lost much of its wealth, power, and influence in the course of the mediatization and secularization of the early 19th century, the church had been in a state of decline.

The papacy was at a weak point in its history, having lost all its territories to Italy, with the pope a "prisoner" in the Vatican. The church strove to regain its influence and to hold sway in such matters as marriage, family, and education. It initiated a Catholic revival by founding associations, papers, schools, social establishments, and new orders, and encouraging religious practices such as pilgrimages, mass assemblies, devotion to the Virgin Mary or the sacred heart of Jesus, and the veneration of relics; the pope himself became an object of devotion. 

Apart from the growth in religious orders, the 19th century was a time when numerous Catholic associations and organisations were founded, especially in Germany and in France. (In the United States, there was a comparable rise in fraternal organizations in the late nineteenth century.) Catholic propaganda, including the interpretation of daily events, was promoted through local and national Catholic newspapers that were prominent in all western European nations. In addition, organized missions and groups were dedicated to producing pious literature.

These generated controversy in some quarters. Under the leadership of Gregory's successor, Pope Pius IX, the church proclaimed Mary's immaculate conception in 1854. In 1864, Pius published the encyclical  with its appended  ("Syllabus of Errors"), and in 1870 convened the First Vatican Council. The Council, in turn, proclaimed the dogma of papal infallibility.

In , the Church condemned as false some 80 philosophical and political statements, mainly the foundations of the modern nation state. It rejected outright such concepts as freedom of religion, separation of church and state, civil marriage, sovereignty of the people, liberalism and socialism, reason as the sole base of human action, and in general condemned the idea of conciliation with progress. The announcements included an index of forbidden books.

The Church gradually reorganized and began to use mass media expansively to promote its messages. In addition, the popes worked to increase their control of the Church. The Church centralized some functions and streamlined its hierarchy, which prompted strong criticism by European governments. The bishops sought direction from the Vatican, and the needs and views of the international church were given priority over the local ones. Opponents of the new hierarchical church organization pejoratively called it ultramontanism.

In view of the church's opposition to enlightenment, liberal reforms, and the revolutions of the 18th/19th centuries, these dogmas and the church's expressed insistence on papal primacy angered the liberal-minded across Europe, even among some Catholics. Debates were heated.

The dogmas were perceived as threatening the secularized state, as they reaffirmed that the fundamental allegiance of Catholics was not to their nation-state, but to the Gospel and the Church. The pope's teaching was promoted as absolutely authoritative and binding on all the faithful. Secular politicians wondered whether "Catholicism and allegiance to the modern liberal state were not mutually exclusive". British Prime Minister Gladstone wrote in 1874 that the teaching on papal infallibility compromised the allegiance of faithful English Catholics. For European liberalism, the dogmas were perceived as a declaration of war against the modern state, science, and spiritual freedom.

The pope's handling of dissent from the dogmas, e. g. by excommunication of critics or demanding their removal from schools and universities, was considered as the "epitome of papal authoritarianism".
In direct response to the Vatican's announcements, Austria passed the so-called May-Laws for Cisleithania in 1868, restricting the Concordat of 1855, and then cancelled the Concordat altogether in 1870.
Saxony and Bavaria withheld approval to publish the papal infallibility dogma; Hesse and Baden even denied it any legal validity.

Germany

Pre-1871 

By the mid-19th century, liberal policies had also come to dominate Germany and the separation of church and state became a prominent issue. The  in Prussia is usually framed by the years 1871 and 1878 with the Catholic Church officially announcing its end in 1880 but the struggle in Germany had been an ongoing matter without definite beginning and the years 1871 to 1878 only mark its culmination in Prussia.

In the wake of other European countries, most German states had taken first steps of secularisation well before unification. Other examples are Prussia (1830s, 1850, 1859, and 1969), Württemberg (1859/1862), Bavaria (1867), Hesse-Nassau or Hesse-Darmstadt.

In the 1837  of legal and policy issues regarding the children of mixed Protestant-Catholic marriages, Prussia's final settlement was considered a defeat for the state as it had given in to demands of the Catholic Church. In 1850, Prussia again had a dispute with the church about civil marriage and primary schools and in 1852, it issued decrees against the Jesuits.
As in many European countries, Jesuits were being banned or heavily restricted in many of the German states e. g. in Saxony (1831) and even in Catholic ones such as Bavaria (1851), Baden (1860) or Württemberg (1862).

Not to be left out, the German areas to the west of the Rhine had already gone through a process of separation of church and state in line with a radical secularization after annexation by revolutionary and Napoleonic France in 1794. After their return to Germany in 1814, many if not most of the changes were kept in place.

In the  period, Catholic publications usually portrayed revolutions as negative and dangerous to the existing order as well as to the interests of the Catholic Church. Most of them considered a viable Catholicism to be necessary for the very health of society and state and to be the only true and effective protection against the scourge of revolution.
The unsuccessful German revolutions of 1848–49, which the Catholic Church had opposed, produced no democratic reforms and attempts to radically disentangle state-church relationships failed. In the revolutionary parliament, many prominent representatives of political Catholicism took the side of the extreme right-wingers. In the years following the revolution, Catholicism became increasingly politicized due to rising liberal ideologies contrasted with the anti-modernist and anti-liberal policies of the Vatican.

In the Austro-Prussian War of 1866 and Franco-Prussian War of 1870 the Catholic Church sided against Prussia and it was an outspoken opponent of German unification under Prussia (as well as of Italy's unification).

The Catholic dogmas and doctrines announced in 1854, 1864 and 1870 were perceived in Germany as direct attacks on the modern nation state. Thus, Bismarck, the Liberals and the Conservatives representing orthodox Protestants found the Centre Party's support of the pope highly provocative. Many Catholics shared these sentiments, especially against the pope's declared infallibility and the majority of Catholic German bishops deemed the definition of the dogma as "'unpropitious' in light of the situation in Germany". While most Catholics eventually reconciled themselves to the doctrine, some founded the small breakaway Old Catholic Church.

According to the Bavarian head of government, Hohenlohe, the dogma of infallibility compromised the Catholic's loyalty to the state. He sent a circular to all the diplomatic representatives of the Bavarian Kingdom saying, "The only dogmatic thesis which Rome desires to have decided by the Council, and which the Jesuits in Italy and Germany are now agitating, is the question of the Infallibility of the Pope. This pretension once become a dogma, will have a wider scope than the purely spiritual spheres, and will become evidently a political question: for it will raise the power of the Sovereign Pontiff, even in temporal matters, above all the princes and peoples of Christendom."

The liberal majorities in the Imperial Diet and the Prussian parliament as well as liberals in general regarded the Church as backward, a hotbed for reactionaries, enemies of progress and cast monastic life as the epitome of a backward Catholic medievalism. They were alarmed by the dramatic rise in the numbers of monasteries, convents and clerical religious groups in an era of widespread religious revival. The Diocese of Cologne, for example, saw a tenfold increase of monks and nuns between 1850 and 1872. Prussian authorities were particularly suspicious of the spread of monastic life among the Polish and French minorities.
The Church, in turn, saw the National-Liberals as its worst enemy, accusing them of spearheading the war against Christianity and the Catholic Church.

1871–72 
At unification in 1871, the new German Empire included 25.5 million Protestants (62% of the population) and 15 million Catholics (36.5% of the population). Although a minority in the empire, Catholics were the majority in the states of Bavaria, Baden, and Alsace-Lorraine as well as in the four Prussian Provinces of West Prussia, Posen, Rhineland, Westphalia and in the Prussian region of Upper Silesia. Since the Thirty Years' War the population was generally segregated along religious lines and rural areas or towns were overwhelmingly if not entirely of the same religion. Education was also separate and usually in the hands of the churches. There was little mutual tolerance, interaction or intermarriage. Protestants in general were deeply distrustful of the Catholic Church.

Unification had been achieved through many obstacles with strong opponents. These were the European powers of France and Austria, both Catholic nations, and the Catholic Church itself, the three of which Bismarck perceived as "Coalition of Catholic Revenge". For Bismarck, the empire was very fragile and its consolidation was an important issue. Biographer Otto Pflanze notes that "all of these developments, real and imagined, reinforced Bismarck's belief in the existence of a widespread Catholic conspiracy that posed a threat to both his German and European policies."

In a Protestant empire, the Catholic Church was to lose its good standing which it had enjoyed for centuries in the Catholic-dominated Holy Roman Empire and which it would have continued to enjoy in a German empire united under Austrian auspices. Thus, in 1870, on the eve of unification, the Center Party was explicitly founded to defend the position of the church in the new empire.

Bismarck was highly concerned that many major members and supporters of this new party were not in sympathy with the new empire: the House of Hanover, the ethnic minority of the Poles, the southern German states. In 1871, the predominantly Catholic states of Southern Germany had only reluctantly joined the empire, increasing the overall share of the Catholic population to 36.5%. Among this Catholic share was Germany's largest ethnic minority, well over 2 million Poles in the east of Prussia, who under Prussia and Germany suffered discrimination and oppression. Bismarck regarded the new Centre Party not only as an illegal mixup of politics and religion and the church's "long arm" but also as a unifying force for Catholic Germans and Poles and thus a threat to the consolidation of the empire. He feared that the Centre Party would frustrate his broader political agendas and he accused the Catholic priests of fostering Polish nationalism as had been done openly in the provinces of Posen and Upper Silesia.

The Liberals regarded the Catholic Church as a powerful force of reaction and anti-modernity, especially after the proclamation of papal infallibility in 1870 and the tightening control of the Vatican over the local bishops. The renewed vitality of Catholicism in Germany with its mass gatherings also attracted Protestants – even the heir to the Prussian throne, with the king's approval, attended one. Anti-liberalism, anti-clericalism, and anti-Catholicism became powerful intellectual forces of the time and the antagonism between Liberals and Protestants on one side and the Catholic Church on the other was fought out through mud-slinging in the press. A wave of anti-Catholic, anticlerical and anti-monastic pamphleteering in the liberal press was answered by anti-liberal preaching and propaganda in Catholic newspapers and vice versa.

For these reasons, the government sought to wean the Catholic masses away from the hierarchy and the Centre Party and the liberal's demands to curb the power of the churches meshed well with Bismarck's main political objective to crush the Centre Party.
According to historian Anthony J. Steinhoff:Bismarck's plan to disarm political Catholicism delighted liberal politicians, who provided the parliamentary backing for the crusade. They wanted victory over Catholicism itself, the long-delayed conclusion of the Reformation.At least since 1847 and in line with the Liberals, Bismarck had also been of the professed opinion, that state and church should be completely separated and "the sphere of the state had to be made secure against the incursions by the church", although his ideas were not as far-reaching as in the United States or in Great Britain. He had in mind the traditional position of the Protestant church in Prussia and provoked considerable resistance from conservative Protestants. This became clear in a heated debate with Prussian culture minister von Mühler in 1871 when Bismarck said: "Since you stopped my plans in the Protestant church, I have to go via Rome." In August 1871, at Bad Ems, Bismarck revealed his intention to fight against the Centre Party, to separate state and church, to transfer school inspection to laymen, to abolish religious instruction from schools and to transfer religious affairs to the minister of justice.

On 22 January 1872, liberal Adalbert Falk replaced conservative Heinrich von Mühler as Prussian minister for religion, education and health. In Bismarck's mind, Falk was "to re-establish the rights of the state in relation to the church". Falk became the driving force behind the  laws. Although Bismarck publicly supported Falk, he doubted the success of his laws and was unhappy with his lack of political tact and sensitivity. The differences in their attitudes concerning the  eventually put the two politicians at odds with each other.

Timeline, 1871–76 

They were mainly directed against clerics: bishops, priests and religious orders (anti-clerical) and enforced the supremacy of the state over the church. While several laws were specific to the Catholic Church (Jesuits, congregations etc.) the general laws affected both Catholic and Protestant churches.
In an attempt to overcome increasing resistance by the Catholic Church and its defiance of the laws, new regulations increasingly went beyond state matters referring to the purely internal affairs of the church. Even many liberals saw them as an encroachment on civil liberties, compromising their own credo.

However, some of the laws were also passed by the Reichstag and applied to all of Germany. In general, the laws did not affect the press and associations including Catholic ones.

1871 
 8 June: Fusion of Catholic and Protestant sections in the Prussian Ministry of Culture (responsible for religious matters). The Catholic section had been installed in 1840. The reason given for the merger was, that "the exclusively political attitude of equal justice to all" was to be adopted and that for that purpose one ecclesiastical department was required. The merger was also a precondition for the School Supervision Act of the following year.
 10 December: Empire, Pulpit Law passed at the initiative of Bavaria and meant to curb what was considered the misuse of religious sermons for political agitation from the pulpit. The law read: "Any cleric or other minister of religion shall be punished with imprisonment or incarceration of up to two years if he, while exercising his occupation or having his occupation exercised, makes state affairs the subject of announcements or discussion either in public before a crowd, in a church, or before any number of people in some other place designated for religious gatherings in such a way that it endangers the public peace."

1872 
 22 January: Adalbert Falk became Prussian minister for spiritual, educational and health matters
 11 March: Prussian . This was a milestone for liberalism, as placing education into the hands of the government had always been at the top of its agenda. Liberals believed it would create an open-minded and neutral system of education, seen as the prerequisite for a progressive society. In the eyes of Bismarck, this law was necessary after the church, putting itself in opposition to the state, used the schools to incite the young against the government.
 April: The Vatican rejected Gustav Adolf, Cardinal Prince of Hohenlohe-Schillingsfürst as German ambassador to the Holy See. Schillingsfürst had been critical of the infallibility dogma but eventually accepted the decision of the council. Therefore, Bismarck took him for a suitable mediator. In response to the rejection, the diplomatic mission was left vacant and Prussia suspended relations with the Vatican in December 1872.
 4 July: German Empire, Jesuit Law banning of the Jesuits who were seen as the emissaries of Rome and the spearhead of ultramontanism. By acknowledging the supremacy of Papal authority, the Jesuits were accused of contesting the secular authority. The law allowed for the dissolution of all Jesuit chapters and expulsion of its members. The following year the law was extended to closely related orders: the Redemptorists, Lazarists, Fathers of the Holy Ghost, and the Ladies of the Sacred Heart. Continued and increasing Church resistance and contempt of the 1871/1872 laws led to changes in the constitution and the enactment of further laws. In order to facilitate these laws, the Prussian Constitution was amended.
 20 September: The Prussian bishops, at a conference in Fulda, protested against the regulations hostile to the church.
 23 December: The pope, in an address to his cardinals, denounced the new laws as persecution of the church.

1873 

 17 January: The term  comes into play. Debating the law on education conditions for the employment of clerics, a Progressive deputy in the Prussian legislature – the distinguished medical scientist and pioneer of public health methods, Rudolf Virchow said:  ('I am of the conviction that this is about a great cultural struggle'). He repeated this term in a call for a vote by the German Progress Party on 23 March 1873. It was ironically picked up and derided in the Catholic press and enthusiastically defended in the liberal.
 30 January: While the laws were being debated in parliament, the Prussian bishops submit a protest against the planned legislation and in a memorial, they announced their opposition to the new laws.
 5 April: Prussia, Amendment of Sections 15, 16 and 18 of the Prussian Constitution:
 In section 15 the sentence "The Protestant and the Roman Catholic Church, as well as every other religious community, regulates and administers its affairs independently" is supplemented by "but remain subject to the laws of the state and its legally regulated superintendence". It is added, that the same applies to the possession or beneficial use of institutions for religion, teaching, charity, endowments and funds.
 Section 16, regarding the unrestricted dealings of religious communities with their seniors and public announcements according to general regulations was cancelled.
 Section 18 cancelled the state's right to appoint, nominate, elect or confirm clerics for a post. But the amendment added, that the state could regulate the minimum education required for clerical posts, the appointment and dismissal of clergymen and servicemen of religion, and define the limits of ecclesiastical disciplinary measures.

 2 May: The bishops issued a common pastoral letter explaining to the faithful the necessity to unanimously and passively resist these laws.
  11–14 May: Four "May Laws" passed in 1873 and were enacted on 11–14 May that year.
 26 May: The bishops issued another pastoral letter calling on the faithful to resist the new laws and informed the Prussian government that they would not cooperate in their execution. Parish councils declined to elect new pastors or accept parish administrators. Exiled or imprisoned bishops used underground networks. Clergy obeying the mandate of the bishops immediately became subject to the punishments prescribed by the laws. Fines were imposed in hundreds of cases and the clerics resisted to pay at which, in turn, the government resorted to force, either by confiscation or imprisonment of up to two years.
 21 November: In his encyclical  on the persecution of the Church in Italy, Germany, and Switzerland, the pope wrote of Germany "No wonder, then, that the former religious tranquility has been gravely disturbed in that Empire by this kind of law and other plans and actions of the Prussian government most hostile to the Church. But who would wish to falsely cast the blame of this disturbance on the Catholics of the German Empire!"

May Laws 
The Falk Laws, or 'May Laws', were a set of laws passed by the Prussian parliament in the years 1873, 1874, and 1875. Four laws passed in 1873 were enacted on 11–14 May that year:
1. Law on religious disaffiliation allowing a person to sever his connection with the church by simple declaration before a justice of the peace. This declaration freed him from all civil effects of belonging to a church, especially ecclesiastical burthens and dues.

2. Law on ecclesiastical disciplinary measures restricting the exercise of ecclesiastical punishments and means of discipline directed against the life, property, freedom or honour of citizens. This included the infliction of the great excommunication if proclaimed with the name of the guilty, because of possible disturbances of civil and social intercourse. Thus, disciplinary measures were almost totally restricted to the spiritual realm (see state Monopoly on violence).

3. Ecclesiastical disciplinary law concerning ecclesiastical power of discipline and the establishment of The Royal Court of Justice for Ecclesiastical Affairs. This subordinated the Catholic Church to state jurisdiction not only in external but also in internal matters. The law regulated the exercise of disciplinary power by church authorities against their officers for special violation of their duties. Members of the court had to be Germans residing in Germany. Bodily chastisement by the Church was entirely forbidden, fines were limited to maximum amounts, restrictions of freedom could only consist in banishment to a church institution within Germany no longer than 3 months and not against the will of the person concerned. On the other hand, the new court also was given jurisdiction over ecclesiastical officers in violation of state laws.
With this law, the German clergy was to be exempt from any juridical body outside of the nation. Hence, judgments of the Holy See or the Roman Rota would not be binding upon them. The highest court was made up of Prussian ecclesiastics, all appointed with the permission of Prussian civil authorities. The Church's juridical and punitive powers were restricted by allowing clerics, e. g. those punished by the Church for not resisting the  laws, to appeal to the Royal Court of Justice for Ecclesiastical Affairs. Bishops in defiance of this law could be deposed.

4. Education standards and civic registry law concerning the education and appointment of priests. Regarding the Protestant Church, these regulations had already been in force for a long time. All men intended for priesthood needed a graduate degree from a German  and study 3 years of theology at a German university.
All appointments of clerics had to be approved by the state. Herewith, training and appointment of the clergy came under state supervision. The traditional regimen of clerical study was to be replaced by a modern education in a liberal German institution, thus ensuring that candidates to the priesthood were imbued with the spirit of secularism. Furthermore, ecclesiastical offices could only be filled with the permission of the highest civil authority in each province, essentially reviving the ancient practice of lay investiture.

1874 
 9 March: Prussian Civil Registry Law (birth, marriage, death). The same law was passed for the whole empire on 6 February 1875.
 4 May: Empire, Expatriation Law was meant to curb the exercise of church duties by clerics without the required consent of authorities. The law stipulated, that in such cases, after a final conviction, a cleric would be banned from his parish or sent to another place within the empire and, in case of reoccurrence, that the cleric would be expatriated and expelled.
 20 May: Prussian Law on the administration of vacant bishoprics. According to the law of 11 May 1873, administrators were to be elected for vacant bishoprics, authorizing laymen to assume administrative responsibilities at the parish level. This additional law stipulated that should an administrator not be elected according to the law, the property would be managed by a state superintendent.
 13 July: In the town of Bad Kissingen, Eduard Kullmann attempted to assassinate Bismarck with a pistol, but only hit his hand. The assassination attempt led to an intensification of the  measures.

1875 
 5 February: The encyclical  declared that the May Laws were invalid, "insofar as they totally oppose the divine order of the Church." The Catholic newspaper  was the first to publish the whole text on the 18th of the same month in Germany. All the following papers publishing the encyclical were confiscated.
 22 April: The Prussian Payment Law (Breadbasket Law) stopped government subsidies and payments for the Catholic bishoprics and clerics unless they signed a declaration of adherence to all laws.
 31 May: Prussian Congregations Law dissolving all orders within 6 months except those involved in care for the infirm. For teaching orders, the time could be extended.
 20 June: Prussian Church Finances Administration Law providing for a representation and a council elected by the parish for the administration of property.
 4 July: Prussian Old-Catholic Church Entitlement Law giving Old-Catholic communities of a certain size the right to use Catholic churches and cemeteries.

1876 
The last two laws passed in 1876 were of no practical importance:
 26 February: The possible punishment for violation of the pulpit law was extended to publications.
 7 June: The State Supervision Act provided for government supervision of all church assets in the Catholic dioceses in Prussia.

Mitigation and Peace Laws, 1878–1887 

The political situation in Europe was very volatile. Initially perceived as a possible enemy hostile to German unification under Prussian leadership, Austria and Germany very quickly became friends and formed the Dual Alliance in 1879. The possibility of a war with France or Russia also became more remote. Therefore, social and economic problems moved to the fore and Bismarck's attention gradually turned to other topics he deemed more threatening such as the increasing popularity of the socialists or more important such as questions of import duties. In these matters, he could either not rely on the support of the liberals to pursue his goals or they were not sufficient to form a majority.
Concerning the rise of the Centre Party, the laws had proven to be greatly ineffective and even counterproductive. He soon realized that they were of no help battling the Centre Party and as far as separation of state and church was concerned, he had achieved more than he wanted. 

In order to garner support for his Anti-Socialist Laws and protective trade tariffs, Bismarck turned his back on the liberals in search of new alliances. The death of Pius IX on 7 February 1878 opened the door for a settlement with the Catholic Church. The new pope, Leo XIII was pragmatic and conciliatory and expressed his wish for peace in a letter to the Prussian king on the very day of his election followed by a second letter in a similar vein that same year.

It came to pass that Falk, vehemently resented by Catholics, resigned on 14 July 1879, which could be read as a peace offering to the Vatican. A decisive boost only came in February 1880, when the Vatican unexpectedly agreed to the civic registry of clerics. As the  slowly wound down the talks lead to a number of so-called mitigation and peace laws which were passed until 1887.

 1880 July: The First Mitigation Law reallowed government payments to Prussian dioceses and freed the bishops from swearing allegiance to the Prussian laws. Hereupon, four new bishops were reinstated where seats had been left vacant after the death of former bishops. Catholic associations involved in the care of the infirm were readmitted.
 1882: Resumption of diplomatic relations between Prussia (not Germany) and the Vatican, which had been cut in 1872
 1882 May 31: The Second Mitigation Law allowed the waiver of government exams for clerics
 1883 July: The Third Mitigation Law legalized all religious actions of bishops and in certain cases, the king could pardon deposed bishops. 280 expelled clerics were pardoned.

On 29 September 1885, as another sign of peace, Bismarck proposed the Pope as arbiter in a dispute with Spain about the Caroline Islands and accepted his verdict in favour of Spain. In gratitude but to the great horror of Catholics, the Pope awarded Bismarck the Supreme Order of Christ, the highest order of chivalry to be granted by the Holy See. Bismarck was the only Protestant ever to receive this award.

After further negotiations between Prussia and the Vatican, the Prussian parliament passed 2 additional laws amending some of the  laws.
 1886 May 21: The First Peace Law amended some of the regulations in the education standards and civic registry law of 11 May 1873 and state exams for clerics (waiver in Second Mitigation Law of 31 May 1882) were totally abolished. Episcopal-theological academies and seminaries, as well as theological studies at these institutions, were readmitted. Students were allowed to be quartered in Catholic boarding houses. The state acknowledged papal disciplinary powers and abolished The Royal Court of Justice for Ecclesiastical Affairs
 1887 April 26: The Second Peace Law readmitted all orders except the Jesuits to Prussia
On 23 May 1887, the Pope declared "The struggle which damaged the church and was of no good to the state is now over". The Mitigation and Peace Laws restored the inner autonomy of the Catholic church while leaving key regulations and the laws concerning separation of church and state in place (civic marriage, civic registry, religious disaffiliation, government school supervision, civic registry of clerics, ban of Jesuits, pulpit law, state supervision of church assets, constitutional amendments and the Catholic section in the Ministry of Culture was not reintroduced).

The respective opposing parties in the Reichstag harshly criticized the concessions made by the Vatican and the Prussian government.
Windthorst and the Centre Party were dismayed at being sidelined and not being consulted about the concessions the pope made, e. g. about the ban on Jesuits or the civil registry of clerics. None of the party's major demands were met. Instead, the pope even sided with Bismarck on non-religious issues and pressured the Centre Party to support Bismarck or at least abstain, e. g. in the matter of the hotly debated  1887 (7-year military budget).
Many Liberals, especially Falk, objected to the concessions Bismarck made to the Church.

The growth of the Centre Party has been considered a major setback for Bismarck although never publicly conceded. Yet, in spite of strong Catholic representation in the Reichstag, the political power and influence of the Church in the public sphere and its political power was greatly reduced.

Although Germany and the Vatican were officially at peace after 1878, religious conflicts and tensions continued. At the turn of the century, Pope Pius X announced the encyclical , mounting new attacks on historical criticism of biblical texts and any accommodation of Catholicism to modern philosophy, sociology or literature. As of 1910, clerics had to take an oath against all forms of modernism, a requirement later extended to teachers of Catholic religion at schools and professors of Catholic theology resulting in intense political and public debates and new conflicts with the state.

Effects and impact 

The abolition of the Catholic section of the Prussian Ministry of ecclesiastical and educational affairs deprived Catholics of their voice at the highest level. The system of strict government supervision of schools was applied only in Catholic areas; the Protestant schools were left alone. The school politics also alienated Protestant conservatives and churchmen.

The British ambassador Odo Russell reported to London in October 1872 how Bismarck's plans were backfiring by strengthening the ultramontane (pro-papal) position inside German Catholicism:
The German Bishops who were politically powerless in Germany and theologically in opposition to the Pope in Rome – have now become powerful political leaders in Germany and enthusiastic defenders of the now infallible Faith of Rome, united, disciplined, and thirsting for martyrdom, thanks to Bismarck's uncalled for antiliberal declaration of War on the freedom they had hitherto peacefully enjoyed.

Nearly all German bishops, clergy and laymen rejected the legality of the new laws and were defiantly facing the increasingly heavy penalties, trials and imprisonments. As of 1878, only three of eight Prussian dioceses still had bishops, some 1,125 of 4,600 parishes were vacant, and nearly 1,800 priests ended up in jail or in exile, nearly half the monks and nuns had left Prussia, a third of the monasteries and convents were closed. Between 1872 and 1878, numerous Catholic newspapers were confiscated, Catholic associations and assemblies were dissolved, and Catholic civil servants were dismissed merely on the pretence of having Ultramontane sympathies. Thousands of laypeople were imprisoned for assisting priests to evade the punitive new laws.

Apart from the outspoken criticism of the  Laws by the Catholic Church and the Centre Party, there were also a number of Liberals and Protestants who voiced concern at least at the so-called  (battle laws). "Unease concerning the effects of his programme continued to spread among all but the most bigoted priest-haters and the most doctrinaire liberals".
Such noted critics outside the Catholic camp were Friedrich Heinrich Geffcken, Emil Albert Friedberg or Julius von Kirchmann. Although they were proponents of state superiority, they regarded some of the laws as either ineffective or as interference in internal church affairs and not consistent with liberal values. Geffcken wrote that "with the intention to emancipate the laity from the hierarchy, the main body of the Catholics was brought in phalanx into the hands of leaders from which it was to be wrested. But the state cannot fight at length against a third of the population, it has no means to break such a passive resistance supported and organized by religious fanaticism. If a statesman desists from the correctness of a measure it only matters that he has the power to enforce it."
Even Bismarck – who initially saw a variety of tactical political advantages in these measures, e. g. for his suppressive policies against the Polish population – took pains to distance himself from the rigors of their enforcement."

The  law considered the harshest and with no equivalent in Europe was the Expatriation Law. Passed by a liberal majority in parliament, it stipulated banishment as a punishment that all civilized peoples considered the harshest beyond the death penalty.

As to the Centre Party, these measures did not have the effect that Bismarck had in mind. In the state elections of November 1873, it grew from 50 to 90 seats and in the  elections from 63 to 91. The number of Catholic periodicals also increased; in 1873 there were about 120.

The  gave secularists and socialists an opportunity to attack all religions, an outcome that distressed the Protestant leaders and especially Bismarck himself, who was a devout pietistic Protestant.

In the face of systematic defiance, the Bismarck government increased the penalties and its attacks, and were challenged in 1875 when a papal encyclical declared that the entire ecclesiastical legislation of Prussia was invalid, and threatened to excommunicate any Catholic who obeyed. There was no violence, but the Catholics mobilized their support, set up numerous civic organizations, raised money to pay fines and rallied behind their church and the Center Party.

To Bismarck's surprise, the Conservative Party especially the Junkers from his own landowning class in East Prussia sided with the Catholics. They were Protestants and did not like the Pope, but they had much in common with the Center Party. The Conservatives controlled their local schools and did not want bureaucrats from Berlin to take them over. They were hostile to the liberals, being fearful of free trade that would put them in competition with the United States and other grain exporters, and disliking their secular views. In the Prussian legislature, they sided with the Center Party on the school issue. Bismarck was livid, and he resigned the premiership of Prussia (while remaining Chancellor of the German Empire), telling an ally, "in domestic affairs I have lost the ground that is for me acceptable through the unpatriotic treason of the Conservative Party in the Catholic question." Indeed, many of Bismarck's conservative friends were in opposition.

The  made Catholics more resolute; they responded not with violence but with votes, and as the newly formed Center Party became a major force in the Imperial Parliament, it gained support from non-Catholic minorities who felt threatened by Bismarck's centralization of power.
In the long run, the most significant result was the mobilization of the Catholic voters through the Center Party, and their insistence on protecting their church. According to Margaret Anderson,
"The effort was perceived, and not only by its opponents, as aiming at nothing less than the forcible assimilation of the Catholic Church and its adherents to the values and norms of the empire's Protestant majority....[it led] Catholics – young and old, male and female, cleric and lay, big men and small – to cleave to their priests and defy the legislation."
After the Center party had doubled its popular vote in the elections of 1874, it became the second largest party in the national parliament, and remained a powerful force for the next 60 years. It became difficult for Bismarck to form a government without their support.
She states that the clergy:
Acquired a pragmatic, but nonetheless real, commitment to democratic elections, parliamentary procedures, and party politics – commitments in which they schooled their flock, by their practice as much as by their preaching."

Anti-Polish aspect of Kulturkampf 
Studies that analyze the nationalist aspect of Kulturkampf point out its anti-Polish character and Bismarck's attempt to Germanize Polish provinces in the German Empire.
The Poles had already suffered from discrimination and numerous oppressive measures in Germany long before unification. These measures were intensified after the German Empire was formed and Bismarck was known to be particularly hostile towards the Poles. Christopher Clark argues that Prussian policy changed radically in the 1870s in the face of highly visible Polish support for France in the Franco-Prussian war. Polish demonstrations made clear the Polish nationalist feeling, and calls were also made for Polish recruits to desert from the Prussian Army – though these went unheeded. Bismarck was outraged, telling the Prussian cabinet in 1871: From the Russian border to the Adriatic Sea we are confronted with the combined propaganda of Slavs, ultramontanes, and reactionaries, and it is necessary openly to defend our national interests and our language against such hostile actions. Therefore, in the Province of Posen the  took on a much more nationalistic character than in other parts of Germany.

Not an adamant supporter of the Liberals' general  goals, Bismarck did recognize the potential in some of them for subduing Polish national aspirations and readily made use of it. While the Liberals main objective was the separation of state and church as essential for a democratic and liberal society, Bismarck saw its use in separating the Polish population from the only supporter and guardian of its national identity.
Prussian authorities imprisoned 185 priests and forced hundreds of others into exile. Among the imprisoned was the Primate of Poland Archbishop Mieczysław Ledóchowski. A large part of the remaining Catholic priests had to continue their service in hiding from the authorities. Although most of the 185 imprisoned were finally set free by the end of the decade, those who were released emigrated. The anti-Polish aspects of the  remained in place in Polish provinces of the German Empire until the First World War.

in Austria 

The  in Austria has roots dating back to the 18th century. Emperor Joseph II launched a religious policy (later called "Josephinism") that advocated the supremacy of the state in religious matters. This resulted in far-reaching state control over the Catholic Church, including the reorganization of dioceses, the regulation of the number of masses, the transfer of many schools into government hands, state-controlled seminaries, and the limitation of the number of clerics and the dissolution of numerous monasteries. Protests of Pope Pius VI, and even his visit to Vienna in 1782, were to no avail.
In the Concordat of 1855, which was the culmination of Catholic influence in Austria, many of the Catholic Church's previous rights that had been taken away under Joseph II were restored (marriage, partial control of censorship, elementary and secondary education, full control of the clergy and religious funds).

In 1868 and 1869, after sanctioning from the December constitution, Emperor Francis Joseph's newly appointed cabinet undid parts of the Concordat by way of several liberal reforms. These reforms are referred to as the May Laws. Against strong protests from the Catholic Church, the laws of 25 May 1868 and 14 May 1869 restored civil marriage, passed primary and secondary education into government hands, installed interconfessional schools, and regulated interconfessional relations (for example, mixed marriages and children's rights to choose their faith).

In a pastoral letter dated 7 September 1868, bishop Franz-Josef Rudigier called for resistance to these May Laws. However, the letter was confiscated, and Rudigier had to appear before court on 5 June 1869. This event led to the first-ever public demonstrations by the Catholic population. On 12 July 1869, the bishop was sentenced to a jail term of two weeks, but he was later pardoned by the emperor.

The May Laws provoked a serious conflict between state and church. After the promulgation of papal infallibility in 1870, Austria abrogated the Concordat of 1855 and abolished it entirely in 1874. In May 1874, the Religious Act was officially recognized.

in contemporary usage

United States 
In the late 19th century, cultural wars arose over issues of prohibition and education in the United States. The Bennett Law was a highly controversial state law passed in Wisconsin in 1889 that required the use of English to teach major subjects in all public and private elementary and high schools. Because Wisconsin German Catholics and Lutherans each operated large numbers of parochial schools where German was used in the classroom, it was bitterly resented by German-American (and some Norwegian) communities. Although the law was ultimately repealed, there were significant political repercussions, with the Republicans losing the governorship and the legislature, and the election of Democrats to the Senate and House of Representatives.

In the United States, the term "culture war(s)" refers to conflict in the late 20th and early 21st centuries between religious social conservatives and secular social liberals. This theme of "culture war" was the basis of Patrick Buchanan's keynote speech at the 1992 Republican National Convention. By 2004, the term was in common use in the United States by both liberals and conservatives.

Throughout the 1980s, there were battles in Congress and the media regarding federal support for the National Endowment for the Arts and the National Endowment for the Humanities that amounted to a war over high culture between neoconservatives and paleoconservatives.
Justice Antonin Scalia referenced the term in the Supreme Court case Romer v. The case concerned an amendment to the Colorado state constitution that prohibited any subdepartment from acting to protect individuals on the basis of sexual orientation. Scalia believed that the amendment was a valid move on the part of citizens who sought "recourse to a more general and hence more difficult level of political decision making than others". The majority disagreed, holding that the amendment violated the Equal Protection clause of the Fourteenth Amendment.

Israel 

See also 
 Febronianism
 Gallicanism
 Josephinism
 Culture war
 Kirchenkampf
 Holy See – Germany relations
 Away from Rome!
 The First School War in Belgium (1879–84)
 The Jules Ferry Laws in France
 Freedom of religion
 Pope Pius IX and Germany

References

Bibliography

Further reading 

 Anderson, Margaret Lavinia. Windthorst: A Political Biography (1981), the leader of the Catholic Center Party
 Bennette, Rebecca Ayako. Fighting for the Soul of Germany: The Catholic Struggle for Inclusion After Unification (Harvard University Press; 2012) 368 pages; examines Catholics' promotion of an alternative national identity after 1871.
 Blackbourn, David. Marpingen: Apparitions of the Virgin Mary in Nineteenth-Century Germany (Oxford, 1993)
 Clark, Christopher and Wolfram Kaiser, eds. Culture Wars: Secular-Catholic Conflict in Nineteenth Century Europe (Cambridge University Press, 2003); Covers 10 countries; online review
 
 Hope, Nicholas,  "Prussian Protestantism," in Philip G. Dwyer, ed. Modern Prussian History: 1830–1947 (2001) pp. 188–208
 Ross, Ronald J.  The failure of Bismarck's Kulturkampf: Catholicism and state power in imperial Germany, 1871–1887, (Washington, D.C., 1998)
 Ross, Ronald J. "Enforcing the Kulturkampf in the Bismarckian state and the limits of coercion in imperial Germany." Journal of Modern History (1984): 456-482. in JSTOR
  
 Trzeciakowski, Lech. The Kulturkampf in Prussian Poland (East European Monographs, 1990) 223 pp
 Weir, Todd. Secularism and Religion in Nineteenth-Century Germany: The Rise of the Fourth Confession, Cambridge University Press, 2014, 9781139867900
 Zeender, John. "Ludwig Windthorst, 1812-1891" History (1992) 77#250 pp 237–54, the leader of the Catholic Center Party

Historiography 
 Anderson, Margaret Lavinia. "Confessions of a Fellow Traveler," Catholic Historical Review (2013) 99#4 pp 623–648.
 Heilbronner, Oded. "From Ghetto to Ghetto: The Place of German Catholic Society in Recent Historiography" Journal of Modern History (2000) 72#2 pp. 453–495. in JSTOR

External links 
 , detailed article by Martin Spahn, written in 1910.
 
 "Bismarck's Failure: the Kulturkampf" long description
 Founding Manifesto of the Protestant League (1887); Statistics on Membership (1887–1913) (English translation) a German anti-Catholic propaganda organization that became active after the Kulturkampf
 Bismarck's Domestic Policies 1871–1890 Kulturkampf in the context of Bismarck's entire domestic policies, by a head of history at Catholic University School in Dublin
 Kulturkampf Now and Then 13-paged essay in pdf by a Professor of the United States Air Force Academy
 Ludwig Windthorst Speaks in the Prussian Parliament (1873) speech of Ludwig Windthorst following its analysis
 Bismarck on the purpose of the Kulturkampf Speech in the Prussian House of Lords, 10 March 1873
 Kulturkampf: Bibliography by LitDok East-Central Europe Herder-Institut (Marburg)

 
19th-century Catholicism
Jesuit history in Europe
History of Catholicism in Germany
History of Catholicism in Italy
Anti-Catholicism in Germany
Politics of the German Empire
Religion and politics
1870s in Germany
German words and phrases
Otto von Bismarck
1870s in Christianity
1870s in Prussia
Sonderbundskrieg
19th century in Switzerland